Beltara Legislative Assembly constituency is one of the 90 Legislative Assembly constituencies of Chhattisgarh state in India.

It is part of Bilaspur district.

Members of the Legislative Assembly

Election results

2018

See also
 List of constituencies of the Chhattisgarh Legislative Assembly
 Bilaspur district, Chhattisgarh

References

Bilaspur district, Chhattisgarh
Assembly constituencies of Chhattisgarh